Hoi Nam is one of the 41 constituencies in the Sha Tin District, one of the 18 districts of Hong Kong.

Created for the 2019 District Council elections, the constituency returns one district councillor to the Sha Tin District Council, with an election every four years.

Hoi Nam loosely covers residential flats in Baycrest, La Costa, Ocean View, Oceanaire and Sausalito in Ma On Shan. It has projected population of 12,926.

Councillors represented

Election results

2010s

References

Ma On Shan
Constituencies of Hong Kong
Constituencies of Sha Tin District Council
2019 establishments in Hong Kong
Constituencies established in 2019